Skinner's Big Idea is a 1928 American comedy film directed by Lynn Shores and written by Matt Taylor and Randolph Bartlett. It is based on the 1918 novel Skinner's Big Idea by Henry Irving Dodge. The film stars Bryant Washburn, William Orlamond, James Bradbury Sr., Robert Dudley, Ole M. Ness and Charles Wellesley. The film was released on April 24, 1928, by Film Booking Offices of America.

Cast           
Bryant Washburn as Skinner
William Orlamond as Hemingway
James Bradbury Sr. as Carlton
Robert Dudley as Gibbs
Ole M. Ness as Perkins
Charles Wellesley as McLaughlin
Martha Sleeper as Dorothy
Hugh Trevor as Jack McLaughlin
Ethel Grey Terry as Mrs. Skinner

References

External links
 

1928 films
1920s English-language films
Silent American comedy films
1928 comedy films
Film Booking Offices of America films
American silent feature films
American black-and-white films
Films directed by Lynn Shores
1920s American films
English-language comedy films